The 2001 FIVB Volleyball Boys' U19 World Championship took place from 22 to 30 September in the Egyptian capital Cairo.

Preliminary round

Pool A

|}

|}

Pool B

|}

|}

Pool C

|}

|}

Pool D

|}

|}

Play-off

Seeding group

|}

Elimination group

|}

Final round

Championship

|}

|}

|}

Classification 5th–8th

|}

|}

Final standing

Awards
MVP:  Mohammad Soleimani
Best Spiker:  Bruno Zanuto
Best Blocker:  Aleksandr Abrossimov
Best Server:  Abdalsalam Abdallah
Best Setter:  Seifeddine Lamjed
Best Digger:  Kwak Dong-Hyuk
Best Receiver:  Farhad Zarif

References

External links
 Official Website

FIVB Volleyball Boys' U19 World Championship
World Youth Championship
V
V